Time in Chad is given by a single time zone, denoted as West Africa Time (WAT; UTC+01:00). Chad shares this time zone with several other countries, including fourteen in western Africa. Chad does not observe daylight saving time (DST).

IANA time zone database 
In the IANA time zone database, Chad is given one zone in the file zone.tab—Africa/Ndjamena. "TD" refers to the country's ISO 3166-1 alpha-2 country code. Data for Chad directly from zone.tab of the IANA time zone database; columns marked with * are the columns from zone.tab itself:

See also 
Time in Africa
List of time zones by country

References

External links 
Current time in Chad at Time.is
Time in Chad at TimeAndDate.com

Time in Chad